Meteo may refer to:
The spelling, without accents, of Météo
Meteo (film), a 1989 Hungarian film
Meteo, an asteroid belt in the Star Fox series of video games
Meteo, a magic spell in some of the Final Fantasy video games
Meteo, a destructive planet in the video game Meteos
 METEO System, a machine translation system for weather bulletins
Meteo is also used as a general abbreviation for meteorology